Miedziankit is a Polish explosive. It consists of 90% potassium chlorate and 10% kerosene.

Miedziankit was developed by Polish chemist  and patented by him in 1909. It was widely used in Germany, Poland, and Russia in the years around World War I, when nitrate-based explosives were needed for the war effort.

It is a Sprengel explosive and can be prepared just before use by soaking chlorate cartridges in kerosene. Alternatively, it can be mixed at the factory, using kerosene with a high enough flash point (above 30°C) to make the explosive safe for transport.

When pressed in a iron tube to a density of 1.7 g/cm3, Miedziankit has a detonation velocity of 3000 m/s.

References

Binary explosives